Enrique Santamarina (February 8, 1870 – April 18, 1937) was an Argentine politician who was Vice President of Argentina from September 6, 1930 to October 20, 1930 under José Félix Uriburu, resigning due to an illness.

References

1870 births
1937 deaths
20th-century Argentine people
Vice presidents of Argentina
People from Tandil
Burials at La Recoleta Cemetery